Recoil is a 1998 action/thriller film written by Richard Preston, Jr., produced by Richard Pepin and Joseph Merhi, directed by Art Camacho and starring Gary Daniels, Gregory A. McKinney, and Robin Curtis.

Plot
When Los Angeles Police Department officers kill a young bank robber after a brutal bank heist, the slain criminal's father, mob boss Vincent Sloan, unleashes a blood bath on the police force.  One by one, Detective Ray Morgan's partners are gunned down, but when his family is murdered, Morgan has nothing left to live for - except revenge.  Becoming an unstoppable one man army, Morgan goes on the ultimate hunt for justice.  At the end, Morgan gets his revenge. He kills Sloan with an exploding barrel.

Cast
 Gary Daniels: Detective Ray Morgan
 Gregory McKinney: Detective Lucas Cassidy (as Gregory A. McKinney)
 Thomas Kopache: Captain Trent (as Tom Kopache)
 Billy Maddox: Mr. Brown
 John Sanderford: Chief Det. Arnold 'Cat' Canton
 Robin Curtis: Julie Sloan
 Kelli McCarty: Tina Morgan
 Maurice Lamont: Off. Alex Boorman
 Richard Foronjy: Vincent Sloan

External links
 
 

1998 films
1998 action thriller films
American action thriller films
American films about revenge
Films set in Los Angeles
Fictional portrayals of the Los Angeles Police Department
Films directed by Art Camacho
1990s English-language films
1990s American films